Jaiprakash Gaur (born 1930) is an Indian entrepreneur. He founded and, until his retirement in 2010, was the chairman of Jaypee Group, a conglomerate with a heavy emphasis on engineering and construction (particularly for infrastructure and power projects), cement, and hydropower production. In 2012 he was ranked by Forbes magazine as the 70th-richest person in India, with an estimated net worth of US$855 million.
 Gaur has been associated with the construction industry for more than five decades.

Early life 
Gaur was born in the village Chitta near Bulandshahr in present Uttar Pradesh. His father was an agricultural inspector in the British government and worked as a serviceman in Beej Godam, Pakki sarai at Anupshahr. He completed his secondary education from LDAV Inter college Anupshahr. After graduating as a civil engineer from the University of Roorkee, he worked as junior engineer in the Uttar Pradesh state irrigation department, but was suspended from the department on charges of corruption.

Career 
After graduation, Gaur joined the state government's irrigation department as a junior engineer. Subsequently he started his own venture as a civil contractor. Two decades later, he laid the foundation for the Jaypee Group by setting up Jaiprakash Associates, a civil engineering and construction company. To leave a secure government job and pursue contractorship in 1958, when it was considered to be most prestigious, required courage. In 1967, he led and transformed a motley group of persons into a company which took pride in its cable address "Iron Will" and went on to execute:

 Sardar Sarovar Dam – India’s largest dam with 7.2 million cu.m. of chilled concrete; larger by 75% in terms of volume than Bhakra Nangal Dam
 Tehri Dam  -  Asia's largest rockfill dam
 Nathpa Jhakri (power house) -  The largest underground power house in India

In 2010 he was ranked by Forbes magazine as the 48th-richest person in India, with an estimated wealth of US$1.5 billion.

Awards and honours 
 2005 "Distinguished Alumni Award" by Indian Institute of Technology Roorkee (erstwhile University of Roorkee), in recognition of his contribution in the field of corporate development/administration/entrepreneurship
 2005 "Lifetime Achievement Award" by Builders' Association of India, in recognition of his outstanding contribution to the Indian construction industry
 2005 "Udyog Ratna" award by the Progress Harmony Development (PHD) Chamber of Commerce & Industry, in recognition of his contribution to the economic development of Madhya Pradesh
 2008 "Entrepreneur of Year Award", by Ernst & Young, for his exceptional contribution in the infrastructure and construction sector
 2010 "Lifetime Achievement Award" by Merchants' Chamber of Uttar Pradesh, Kanpur, for creating new milestones in infrastructure development and for his achievement in corporate social responsibility

References 

Date of birth unknown
Businesspeople from Uttar Pradesh
Indian billionaires
Living people
People from Bulandshahr district
Jaypee Group
Year of birth uncertain
Year of birth missing (living people)